Rescue Me is the official soundtrack to the American dark comedy TV show Rescue Me. The official soundtrack was released on May 8, 2006 on Nettwerk records.

Track listing
"C'mon C'mon" - The Von Bondies – 2:14
"Devil" - Stereophonics – 4:41
"I'll Be Your Man" - The Black Keys – 2:21
"Bonnie Brae" - The Twilight Singers – 4:50
"All the Wild Horses" - Ray LaMontagne – 3:17
"Shine a Light" - Wolf Parade – 3:44
"Karaoke Soul" - Tom McRae – 3:53
"Love is Blindness" - The Devlins – 3:15
"Fell on Bad Days" - Rubyhorse – 3:58
"Wipe That Smile Off Your Face" - Our Lady Peace – 4:24
"Open Heart Surgery" - The Brian Jonestown Massacre – 4:14
"Oh Yeah" - The Subways – 2:58
"Pussywillow" - Greg Dulli – 3:40
"Just a Dream" - Griffin House – 6:29

In Show Music
Below is a list of the music used in individual episodes of the series, including music not included in the soundtracks.
"C'mon C'mon" by The Von Bondies - Theme Song for the Show
"Don't Panic" by Coldplay - Season 1, Episode 1 "Guts"
"Sign of Respect" by Mastersource - Season 1, Episode 2 "Gay"
"Stronger Than Dirt"  by Tom McRae - Season 1, Episode 2 "Gay"
"Never Run" by The Bitch Allstars - Season 1, Episode 2 "Gay"
"Summer's Over" by The Stafford 4 - Season 1, Episode 4 "DNA"
"When All Is Said and Done" by Tyrone Wells - Season 1, Episode 4 "DNA"
"What Is It Now?" by Edison - Season 1, Episode 5 "Orphans"
"Chasing Dreams" by Magnet - Season 1, Episode 5 "Orphans"
"Goodbye to Yesterday" by Edison - Season 1, Episode 5 "Orphans"
"Refuse to Lose" by Black Toast - Season 1, Episode 5 "Orphans"
"Bossa Me" by Chris Falson - Season 1, Episode 6 "Revenge"
"Can't Go On Livin'" by The Bitch Allstars - Season 1, Episode 7 "Butterfly"
"Karaoke Soul" by Tom McRae - Season 1, Episode 7 "Butterfly"
"All I Can Do" by Tyrone Wells - Season 1, Episode 8 "Inches"
"Goodbye" by The Three Men Out - Season 1, Episode 8 "Inches"
"Amazing Grace" by the FDNY Pipe and Drum - Season 1, Episode 8 "Inches"
"I'll Be Your Man" by The Black Keys - Season 1, Episode 9 "Alarm"
"Any Other Way" by Public - Season 1, Episode 10 "Immortal"
"Soul Shifter" by Mastersource - Season 1, Episode 10 "Immortal"
"To Know Your Love" by Devin Powers - Season 1, Episode 10 "Immortal"
"Lucky" by Miss Bizzario - Season 1, Episode 11 "Mom"
"No Clarify" by Jeff Cardoni - Season 1, Episode 11 "Mom"
"LAPMZ2543" by LA Post - Season 1, Episode 12 "Leaving"
"Just a Dream" by Griffin House - Season 1, Episode 12 "Leaving"
"Fell On Bad Days" by Rubyhorse - Season 1, Episode 13 "Sanctuary"
"Out of Training" by Jeff Cardoni - Season 1, Episode 13 "Sanctuary"
"Stand Tall" by Edison - Season 1, Episode 13 "Sanctuary"
"In This Place" by Scott Aaronson - Season 1, Episode 13 "Sanctuary"
"Let Somebody Love Me" by Solomon Burke - Season 2, Episode 6 "Reunion"
"Broken" by Alaska! - Season 2, Episode 6 "Reunion"
"Pussywillow" by Greg Dulli - Season 2, Episode 9 "Rebirth"
"Run" by Snow Patrol - Season 2, Episode 10 "Brains"
"Make it Up" by Ben Kweller - Season 2, Episode 11 "Bitch"
"All the Wild Horses" by Ray LaMontagne - Season 2, Episode 12 "Happy"
"Devil" by Stereophonics - Season 3, Episode 1 "Devil"
"Bonnie Brae" by The Twilight Singers - Season 3, Episode 2 "Discovery"
"Shine a Light" by Wolf Parade - Season 3, Episode 5 "Chlamydia"
"Open Heart Surgery" by The Brian Jonestown Massacre - Season 3, Episode 5 "Chlamydia"
"Oh Yeah" by The Subways - Season 3, Episode 8 "Karate"
”Hell is Around the Corner” by Tricky - Season 3, Episode 12 “Hell”
"Swing Low" by Rocco DeLuca and the Burden - Season 4, Episode 9 "Animal"
"Front Street" by The Gutter Twins - Season 5, Episode 1 "Baptism"
"J'arrive à la ville" by Lhasa de Sela - Season 5, Episode 3 "Wine"
"The Guns of Brixton" by The Clash - Season 5, Episode 4 "Jimmy"
"Glory Box" by Portishead - Season 5, Episode 9 "Thaw"
"Shame" by Enablers - Season 5, Episode 9 "Thaw"
"Synthetic Self" by Apache Stone - Season 5, Episode 10 "Control"
"If You Stayed Over" by Bonobo - Season 5, Episode 10 "Control"
"Captured Blues" by Enablers - Season 5, Episode 11 "Mickey"
"Syrup and Honey" by Duffy - Season 5, Episode 12 "Disease"
"New York" by Cat Power - Season 5, Episode 13 "Torch"
"Break My Heart" by The Love Me Nots - Season 5, Episode 15 "Initiation"
"My Blue Manhattan" by Ryan Adams - Season 5, Episode 17 "Lesbos"
"Got Messed Up" by R.L. Burnside - Season 5, Episode 18 "Carrot"
"Walk Away" by Dropkick Murphys - Season 5, Episode 19 "David"
"Grounds for Divorce" by Elbow - Season 5, Episode 21 "Jump"
"This Is the Army of Forgotten Souls" by Transglobal Underground - Season 5, Episode 22 "Drink"
"Fresh Blood" by Eels - Season 6, Episode 1 "Legacy"
"Come on Over (Turn Me On)" by Isobel Campbell & Mark Lanegan - Season 6, Episode 4 "Breakout"
"It Had to Be You" by Tony Bennett - Season 6, Episode 7 "Forgiven"
"Who Am I" by Chapter 3 - Season 6, Episode 8 "Cowboy"
"More Than I Have (Nashville)" by Jennifer Clarke - Season 6, Episode 10 "A.D.D."
"I've Got the World on a String" by Frank Sinatra - Season 7, Episode 2 "Menses"
"Beyond This World" by The Enablers - Season 7, Episode 4 "Brownies"
"Dirty Old Town" by The Pogues - Season 7, Episode 9 "Ashes"
Note - "Wipe That Smile off Your Face" and "Love is Blindness" weren't aired during the show.

Television soundtracks
2006 soundtrack albums